She's So Unusual is the debut studio album by American singer and songwriter Cyndi Lauper, released on October 14, 1983, by Portrait Records. The album was re-released in 2014 to commemorate its 30th anniversary, and was called She's So Unusual: A 30th Anniversary Celebration. The re-release contains demos and remixes of previously released material, as well as new artwork.

In 1978, Lauper formed the band Blue Angel. The band soon signed a recording contract with Polydor Records; however, their debut album, Blue Angel, was a commercial failure. The band parted ways after firing their manager, who sued Lauper for $80,000 and forced her into bankruptcy. Lauper went on to sing in many New York night clubs, and caught the eye of David Wolff, who became her manager and subsequently got her signed to Portrait Records.

Six singles were released from the album, with "Girls Just Want to Have Fun" becoming a worldwide hit and her first song to chart on the Billboard Hot 100. "Time After Time" became her first number-one hit on the chart and experienced similar success worldwide. Lauper found success with the next two singles as well, with both "She Bop" and "All Through the Night" peaking in the top five. This makes Lauper the first female singer to have four top five singles on the Hot 100 from one album. She's So Unusual was promoted by the Fun Tour throughout 1983 and 1984.

The album is primarily new wave-based, with many of the songs being influenced by synthpop and pop rock. Upon its release, the album received positive reviews from music critics, who noted Lauper's unique vocals. Lauper earned several awards and accolades for the album, including two Grammy Awards at the 27th Grammy Awards, one of which was for Best New Artist. She's So Unusual peaked at number four on the Billboard 200 chart and stayed in the chart's top forty for 65 weeks. It has sold over 6 million copies in the United States and 16 million copies worldwide. This makes it Lauper's best-selling album to date and one of the best-selling albums of the 1980s. In 2003, She's So Unusual was ranked at number 494 on Rolling Stones list of the 500 greatest albums of all time, and it subsequently placed at number 184 in a 2020 reboot of the list. In 2019, the album was selected by the Library of Congress for preservation in the United States National Recording Registry for being "culturally, historically, or aesthetically significant".

Background 
In 1978, Lauper met saxophone player John Turi and formed the band Blue Angel. They recorded a demo tape of original music. Steve Massarsky heard the tape and liked Lauper's voice. He bought out Blue Angel's contract for $5,000 and became their manager.

Lauper received many offers to go solo, but rebuffed any offer that didn't include the rest of the band. Blue Angel was eventually signed by Polydor Records and released a self-titled album on the label in 1980. Despite some positive critical attention, the album was a commercial failure. The members of Blue Angel also had a falling-out with Massarsky and fired him as their manager. He later filed an $80,000 suit against them, which forced Lauper into bankruptcy.

After Blue Angel broke up, Lauper spent time working in retail stores and singing in local clubs. In 1981, while singing in a local New York bar, Lauper met David Wolff, who took over as her manager. With his help, Lauper signed with Portrait Records, a subsidiary of Epic Records, in the spring of 1983 and soon began recording her debut album.

Artwork 
The front cover of She's So Unusual was photographed on Henderson Walk in Coney Island, New York in the summer of 1983 by Annie Leibovitz. Lauper is depicted wearing a vintage red prom-style dress that she purchased at the vintage clothing shop where she used to work, Screaming Mimi's. She is also seen holding a bouquet of flowers which were purchased from a vendor on the boardwalk at the time of the shoot. Lauper has heavy costume jewelry on her ears, arms, neck and her right ankle. She is barefoot, with the exception of the fishnet stockings, and her red high-heels appear to have been taken off in front of her as they lay on their sides at the bottom of the photo. The cover shot was captured in front of the wax museum, The World In Wax Musee. It can be seen behind Lauper that the museum had been closed for some time and at the time of closure was featuring a wax statue of Puerto Rican baseball great Roberto Clemente. The wooden awning above the doorway with the two blue panels read the name of the museum. The first panel read "The World" and second panel read "In Wax". This was airbrushed out of the photograph.

The cover won Janet Perr the Grammy Award for Best Recording Package in 1985.

Singles 
The lead single from the album was "Girls Just Want to Have Fun", released on September 6, 1983. This single achieved massive success in the United States with its music video playing in heavy rotation on several stations, and eventually peaking at number two on the Billboard Hot 100. It received Platinum certification from the Recording Industry Association of America (RIAA) for sales of 2,000,000 copies. The single was a success internationally, reaching the top ten in 19 countries and number one in 10 countries, including; Australia, Canada, Ireland, Japan, New Zealand, Brazil and Norway. "Girls Just Want to Have Fun" received nominations at the 1985 Grammy Awards for Record of the Year and Best Female Pop Vocal Performance, and won Best Female Video at the 1984 MTV Video Music Awards, among several nominations.

"Time After Time" was the second single released from the album, and was released in April 1984. It repeated the success of the previous single and spent two consecutive weeks at number one on the Billboard Hot 100, becoming Lauper's first number one hit on the Hot 100 and eventually spending a total of 20 weeks on the chart and receiving Gold certification from the RIAA for 1,000,000 copies sold. Like the previous single, "Time After Time" was an international success and reached the top ten in 15 countries. The song received a Grammy nomination for Song of the Year.

The third single from the album was "She Bop", released on July 2, 1984.  This single reached number three on the Hot 100, becoming her third consecutive top five hit, and spent a total of 18 weeks on the chart. With sales of over 1,000,000 copies, the song was certified Gold by the RIAA. The single proved to be another international success for Lauper, reaching the top ten in 8 countries. "She Bop" was controversial upon release and placed at number 15 on the PMRC's "Filthy Fifteen".

"All Through the Night" was single number four, released in September 1984. Like Lauper's previous three singles, "All Through The Night" reached the top five of the Hot 100 with a peak of number five. It was written by, and originally recorded by Jules Shear, who provided backup vocals as well. The song was a moderate international success, reaching the top ten in 6 countries, and received Gold certification in Canada.

Single number five was "Money Changes Everything", released in December 1984. It was a moderate success and reached number #27 on the Hot 100, Lauper's first single to not reach the top ten. It also did moderately well in Australia, reaching #19 on its chart.

The sixth and final single from the album was a cover of the Prince song, "When You Were Mine", released on January 31, 1985, in Canada and Japan only. It achieved little success, reaching number #62 on the Canadian Singles Chart.

Reception 

She's So Unusual peaked at number four on the Billboard 200 chart, due to the success of the album's first single on U.S. radio and heavy airplay of its music video on MTV. In the weeks following, the album's sales remained stable thanks to the following four singles and Lauper's world tour and appearances on popular television and radio programs. Overall, the album stayed 77 weeks on the Billboard 200. It became one of the best-selling albums of 1984. At least until 1986, the album was the second best-selling album in Canada by a female artist during the decade, behind Whitney Houston's self-titled debut album, selling more than 900,000 copies. She's So Unusual has since sold over six million copies in the United States, where it was certified six times platinum by the RIAA. The album has sold over 16 million copies worldwide.

She's So Unusual was voted the eleventh best album of the year in The Village Voices annual Pazz & Jop critics' poll for 1984. In a retrospective review for AllMusic, music critic Stephen Thomas Erlewine called the album a "giddy mix of self-confidence, effervescent popcraft, unabashed sentimentality, subversiveness, and clever humor". Sal Cinquemani of Slant Magazine called it "a pop classic". Alternative Press said that, with "some fine tunes" and the CD reissue's three bonus tracks, the album "certainly bears another listen."

Accolades 
She's So Unusual and its singles earned Lauper six Grammy Award nominations, including Album of the Year and ultimately winning the awards for Best Recording Package and Best New Artist. "Girls Just Want to Have Fun" was nominated for Record of the Year and Best Female Pop Vocal Performance, and "Time After Time" was nominated for Song of the Year. Lauper earned ten MTV Video Music Award nominations. "Girls Just Want to Have Fun" received six nominations including Video of the Year, and won for Best Female Video. "Time After Time" received three nominations and "She Bop" received one nomination.

She's So Unusual was ranked at number 494 on Rolling Stones list of the 500 greatest albums of all time in 2003, rising to number 487 in a 2012 update of the list, then to number 184 in a 2020 update. Rolling Stone also placed She's So Unusual at number 41 on its 2002 list of 50 essential albums by women in rock, and the record retained the placement on a similar list published by the magazine a decade later. In 2012, Slant Magazine listed it as the 22nd best album of the 1980s, calling it an "absolutely peerless collection of profound pop jewels". In 2019, the Library of Congress selected She's So Unusual for preservation in the National Recording Registry for being "culturally, historically, or aesthetically significant".

|-
|rowspan="9"|1984
|rowspan="6"|"Girls Just Want to Have Fun"
|MTV Video Music Award for Video of the Year
|
|-
|MTV Video Music Award for Best New Artist
|
|-
|MTV Video Music Award for Best Female Video
|
|-
|MTV Video Music Award for Best Concept Video
|
|-
|MTV Video Music Award – Viewer's Choice
|
|-
|MTV Video Music Award for Best Overall Performance
|
|-
|rowspan="3"|"Time After Time"
|MTV Video Music Award for Best New Artist
|
|-
|MTV Video Music Award for Best Female Video
|
|-
|MTV Video Music Award for Best Direction
|
|-
|rowspan="7"| 1985 || Cyndi Lauper || Grammy Award for Best New Artist || 
|-
|rowspan="2"| She's So Unusual || Grammy Award for Best Album Package || 
|-
| Grammy Award for Album of the Year || 
|-
|rowspan="2"| "Girls Just Want To Have Fun" || Grammy Award for Record of the Year || 
|-
| Grammy Award for Best Female Pop Vocal Performance || 
|-
|"Time After Time" || Grammy Award for Song of the Year|| 
|-
|"She Bop"
|MTV Video Music Award for Best Female Video
|

30th Anniversary Tour 
2013 marked the 30th Anniversary of She's So Unusual. To honor it and to thank her fans for its success, Lauper embarked on a World Tour called the "She's So Unusual: 30th Anniversary Tour".

A part of the show, Lauper sings the entire track listing of the record in the order it appears on the CD while telling stories about the production of the record and her life at the time she recorded it.

Track listing

Original release

Notes
"Irvine Meadows" live tracks recorded on the Fun Tour at Irvine Meadows Amphitheater, Laguna Hills, California, USA (September 22, 1984).
"Summer Sonic 07" live track recorded at Japan Summer Sonic Festival, either Osaka (August 11, 2007) or Tokyo (August 12, 2007).
Tracks 11 to 13 are bonus tracks on the 2000 remastered version (and after)
Tracks 11 to 14 are bonus tracks on the 2008 Japan remastered Mini-LP version (& 2013 re-issue of same).
In 2013, the 2008 Japan remaster was reissued on BSCD2 format with the same 2008 track listing.

30th Anniversary Reissue (2014)

Note
"The Goonies 'R' Good Enough" is featured as a bonus track on disc one of the deluxe edition in Japan.

Personnel

 Cyndi Lauper – lead vocals, backing vocals, arrangements
 Rob Hyman – keyboards, backing vocals, arrangements (1, 2, 4-10)
 Richard Termini – synthesizers
 Peter Wood – synthesizers
 Eric Bazilian – arrangements (1, 2, 4-10), melodica, guitars, bass, saxophone (10), backing vocals
 Rick DiFonzo – guitars
 Neil Jason – guitars, bass
 William Wittman – guitars, arrangements (3)
 Anton Fig – drums, percussion
 Rick Chertoff – percussion, arrangements 
 Krystal Davis – backing vocals
 Ellie Greenwich – backing vocals
 Jules Shear – backing vocals
 Maeretha Stewart – backing vocals
 Diane Wilson – backing vocals

Production
 Rick Chertoff – producer 
 William Wittman – associate producer, engineer 
 Lennie Petze – executive producer 
 John Jansen – additional engineer
 Rod O'Brien – additional engineer
 John Agnello – assistant engineer 
 Dan Beck – product manager
 Amy Linden – liner notes
 Janet Perr – art direction, design, cover art concept
 Cyndi Lauper – cover art concept
 Ralph Scibelli – hair design
 Justin Ware – hair design
 Laura Wells – stylist 
 Annie Leibovitz – photography
 David Wolff – management 
 Joseph Zynczak – management

Reissue Credits
 Bruce Dickinson – producer 
 Cyndi Lauper – producer (live tracks)
 Lennie Petze – producer (live tracks)
 Steve Berkowitz – A&R direction
 Patti Matheny – A&R coordinator 
 Darren Salmieri – A&R coordinator
 George Marino – mastering at Sterling Sound (New York, NY).
 John Jackson – project director 
 John Christiana – packaging manager 
 Howard Fritzson – art direction 
 Janet Perr – design

Charts

Weekly charts

Year-end charts

Decade-end charts

Certifications and sales

References

Bibliography

External links 

She's So Unusual (Adobe Flash) at Radio3Net (streamed copy where licensed)
She's So Unusual at discogs.

Cyndi Lauper albums
Portrait Records albums
Epic Records albums
1983 debut albums
Albums produced by Rick Chertoff
Albums recorded at Record Plant (New York City)
United States National Recording Registry recordings
United States National Recording Registry albums